Todd A. Breitenstein (March 3, 1966 – March 24, 2013) was a game designer.

Career
For two years beginning in 2000, Todd Breitenstein worked for Cincinnati-based United States Playing Card Company's game division. In 2002, he and his wife Kerry started the game company Twilight Creations, of which he was president. He designed the board game Zombies!!!

References

1966 births
2013 deaths
American game designers